Dinty is a 1920 American silent comedy drama film written by Marshall Neilan and John McDermott specifically for Wesley Barry, a young actor known for his freckled complexion. Prominent among the supporting players were Colleen Moore, Marjorie Daw, Pat O'Malley, and Noah Beery.

Together with the African American Aaron Mitchell and the Chinese-American Walter Chung, Barry creates the prototype of the multi-ethnic baby gang which will serve as a model for the successful series of Our Gang (1922–44) and in other feature films like  Little Annie Rooney  (1925) with Mary Pickford.

The film is extant, archived in the Filmmuseum in Amsterdam.

Plot
In a village in the Irish woods, young Doreen Adair (Colleen Moore) falls in love with a young man, Danny O'Sullivan (Tom Gallery). One day, Danny receives notice that he is offered a job in America. Before leaving, he marries Doreen. A year later, a son is born, and Doreen decides to follow her husband to America. Upon arriving in San Francisco from Ireland, Doreen discovers through Danny's landlady Mrs. O'Toole (Kate Price) that her husband has been killed in a car accident.

To support herself and her infant son Dinty, Doreen labors night shifts as a scrub woman until, at the age of twelve, Dinty (Wesley Barry) becomes the family's breadwinner by selling newspapers, forming his own street gang with other children. Doreen, meanwhile, suffers from tuberculosis and gets weaker by the day.

Meanwhile, in Chinatown, when Judge Whitely (J. Barney Sherry) imprisons the son of opium smuggler Wong Tai (Noah Beery), Wong Tai retaliates by kidnapping the judge's daughter (Marjorie Daw). Dinty, whose work as a newsboy has familiarized him with the Chinese underworld, leads police to Wong Tai's hideout and saves the judge's daughter from a bizarre death by torture. As Dinty's mother has succumbed to tuberculosis, the grateful Judge Whitely adopts Dinty.

Cast

 Wesley Barry as Dinty O'Sullivan
 Colleen Moore as Doreen O'Sullivan
 Tom Gallery as Danny O'Sullivan
 J. Barney Sherry as Judge Whitely
 Marjorie Daw as Ruth Whitely
 Pat O'Malley as Jack North
 Noah Beery as Wong Tai
 Walter Chung as Sui Lung
 Kate Price as Mrs. O'Toole
 Tom Wilson as Barry Flynn
 Aaron Mitchell as Alexander Horatius Jones
 Newton Hall as The tough one
 Young Hipp as Wong Tai's son
 Hal Wilson
 Anna May Wong as Half Moon (uncredited)

Production
In an earlier film, Go and Get It (1920), Barry played a supporting role as a paperboy named "Dinty". Neilan used the character to create a story in a similar vein as a starring vehicle for Barry, who was being groomed by the studio.

Moore, on loan from Christie Film Company, would sign a lucrative contract with Neilan when production for Dinty was completed. Anna May Wong appeared in an uncredited role that also led to more work with Neilan; after Dinty, he created a role for her in Bits of Life for which she earned her first screen credit.

Portions of the film were shot on location in San Francisco including Chinatown and Adolph B. Spreckels' Spreckels Mansion. The end of the film was shot on location on Catalina Island. Sets were designed by Ben Carré.

Release
Released November 29, 1920, Dinty was successful. A booklet on Wesley Barry's life was put out concurrently, part of the movie's promotional strategy. Neilan also used the release of Dinty to debut a campaign to improve the artistic quality of film stills.

Reviews of the film were generally favorable. The Dramatic Mirror called it "a photoplay of remarkable direction, excellent acting ... and perfect photography". The reviewer for Motion Picture News wrote: "There are enough elements in this feature to please every type of picturegoer." Positive reviews appeared in trade papers Variety, Wid's, and the Exhibitors Herald.

Some of the positive reviews were conditional.  The Photoplay reviewer commented that Neilan's "human touch ... however obvious and conventional it may become, is usually effective".  The New York Times  critic noted the "deliberateness" that led to a deficiency in "genuineness", especially in the dramatic and action scenes.

References

External links

 
 
 Dinty at Silent Era website

1920 films
American silent feature films
Films directed by Marshall Neilan
Films directed by John McDermott
Films set in San Francisco
American black-and-white films
1920s English-language films
1920 comedy-drama films
Articles containing video clips
Films shot in San Francisco
1920s American films
Silent American comedy-drama films